Billy Clifford Gilmour (born 11 June 2001) is a Scottish professional footballer who plays as a central midfielder for Premier League club Brighton & Hove Albion and the Scotland national team.

Gilmour spent three months at a young age with Celtic before moving to Rangers, where he developed in the club's academy and trained with the first-team squad at the age of 15. He joined Chelsea in 2017 after turning down a professional contract with Rangers. Gilmour made 22 appearances for the Blues and was on the bench for the 2021 UEFA Champions League and FA Cup finals. He spent a season on loan at Norwich City where the club were eventually relegated before he signed with Brighton & Hove Albion on a permanent move the season after on summer deadline day 2022. 

He represented Scotland at every youth level from under-15, under-16, under-17, under-19 and under-21 levels before making his senior debut in 2021.

Early life
Gilmour was born on 11 June 2001 at Ayrshire Central Hospital in Irvine, Ayrshire and resided in Ardrossan, North Ayrshire. His father served with the Royal Navy and played junior football for Ardrossan Winton Rovers. Gilmour attended Stanley Primary School in Ardrossan and Grange Academy in Kilmarnock, where he was part of the Scottish Football Association (SFA) Performance School programme. He listed Cesc Fàbregas, Luka Modrić and Andrés Iniesta as his football role models.

Club career

Rangers
Gilmour spent three months at a young age with Celtic, before moving to Rangers due to the logistics of attending training. He made his debut for the under-20 development team in December 2016 at the age of 15, and was invited to train with the first-team squad the following month by manager Mark Warburton. Gilmour was given a squad number and, following Warburton's departure from the club, was twice included in the provisional squad for the Scottish Cup matches by Rangers caretaker manager Graeme Murty.

The next Rangers manager, Pedro Caixinha, described Gilmour as a player with a "bright future" and held talks with the player's family in an attempt to persuade him to stay with the club. Rangers, however, announced in May 2017 that they had reached an agreement for Gilmour to join Chelsea for a "significant fee". Reports suggested that Chelsea would pay an initial development fee of around £500,000, with potential further payments dependent on his progress. SFA Performance Director Malky Mackay had advised Gilmour and his family that he should stay at Rangers, as he would have had more chance of gaining first team experience. Mackay said, "I really hope he goes out on loan quickly to someone and keeps progressing".

Chelsea

Youth
Gilmour became officially contracted to Chelsea in July 2017, following his 16th birthday. He joined the club's under-18 squad, making a goalscoring debut in an Under-18 Premier League match against Arsenal during September 2017, and going on to score in each of his first three appearances. In July 2018, after turning 17, Gilmour signed his first professional contract with Chelsea.

2019–20

Newly-appointed Chelsea manager Frank Lampard gave Gilmour his senior debut on 10 July 2019, in a pre-season friendly against Bohemians in Dublin. His first appearance in a competitive matchday squad for the first-team came in the 2019 UEFA Super Cup against Liverpool, when he was an unused substitute.

He made his Premier League debut on 31 August against Sheffield United, coming on in the 84th minute for Tammy Abraham. He made his full debut on 25 September, playing the full 90 minutes in a 7–1 EFL Cup win against Grimsby Town. Gilmour was added to the Chelsea first-team squad on a permanent basis in February 2020. He was widely praised for his performance in a 2–0 win against Liverpool in an FA Cup tie on 3 March. Gilmour would later make his first Premier League start later that week on 8 March against Everton, earning Man of the Match honours in a 4–0 win. He did not play much for the next six months or so, due to the lockdown caused by COVID-19 and a knee injury. Gilmour made 11 appearances for the Chelsea first team during the 2019–20 season.

2020–21
In September 2020, Gilmour took the 23 squad number for 2020–21 season after Michy Batshuayi returned to Crystal Palace on loan. Gilmour returned to the Chelsea starting lineup on 8 December 2020, when he made his first Champions League start in a 1–1 draw with Krasnodar. Under Thomas Tuchel, Gilmour would feature periodically. Gilmour was an unused substitute as Chelsea defeated Manchester City 1–0 in the 2021 UEFA Champions League Final on 29 May.

2021–22: loan to Norwich City
In July 2021, Gilmour joined fellow Premier League club Norwich City on a season-long loan. Gilmour cited fellow Scotland international Grant Hanley as an influencing factor in his decision to join the club. He played 28 times for Norwich during the 2021–22 season, but the team finished last in the 2021–22 Premier League and were relegated.

In June 2022, Chelsea exercised an option to extend Gilmour's contract to the end of the 2023–24 season.

Brighton & Hove Albion 
On 1 September 2022, Gilmour transferred to fellow Premier League club Brighton & Hove Albion on a four-year deal. He made his debut three days later, coming on as a 90+3rd minute substitute for Moisés Caicedo in the 5–2 home win over Leicester. Gilmour made his first Albion start on 9 November, playing the whole match of the 3–1 EFL Cup third round victory away at Arsenal, assisting Tariq Lamptey's goal. His first Premier League start for Brighton came on his sixth appearance, playing the whole match and picking up a yellow card in the 4–2 home loss against Arsenal on 31 December.

International career

Gilmour played for the Scotland under-16s in the 2016 Victory Shield tournament. He made his Scotland under-17 debut against Italy in August 2017, and scored his first international goal in a 2–1 defeat against England two days later. Under-21 debut followed when he featured in a 1–0 win against France at the 2018 Toulon Tournament, and won the Revelation of the Tournament award after helping Scotland to a fourth-placed finish.

Gilmour was included in the Scotland for UEFA Euro 2020 by Steve Clarke. He made his full international debut on 2 June 2021, coming off the bench in the 81st minute of a pre-tournament friendly against the Netherlands. Gilmour made his first start for Scotland in a goalless draw against England on 18 June, and was awarded man of the match by UEFA. He then tested positive for COVID-19, meaning that he missed Scotland's final group game against Croatia.

Gilmour remained in the squad for Scotland's continuing 2022 World Cup qualifiers in September, starting all five games against Denmark, Moldova, Austria, Israel and the Faroe Islands. His performances were widely acclaimed, with him winning man of the match in the 1–0 victory over Moldova at Hampden.

Career statistics

Club

International

Honours
Chelsea Youth
U18 Premier League: 2017–18
FA Youth Cup: 2017–18

Chelsea
UEFA Champions League: 2020–21
FA Cup runner-up: 2020–21

Individual
Toulon Tournament Breakthrough of the Tournament: 2018
Toulon Tournament Best XI: 2018
Chelsea Academy Player of the Year: 2019–20

References

External links

Profile at the Chelsea F.C. website

2001 births
Living people
Footballers from Irvine, North Ayrshire
Scottish footballers
Scotland youth international footballers
Scotland under-21 international footballers
Scotland international footballers
Association football midfielders
Rangers F.C. players
Chelsea F.C. players
Norwich City F.C. players
Brighton & Hove Albion F.C. players
Premier League players
UEFA Champions League winning players
UEFA Euro 2020 players
People educated at Grange Academy, Kilmarnock